Rushukha is a rural locality (a selo) in Muninsky Selsoviet, Botlikhsky District, Republic of Dagestan, Russia. The population was 57 as of 2010.

Geography 
Rushukha is located 16 km northeast of Botlikh (the district's administrative centre) by road. Shivor is the nearest rural locality.

References 

Rural localities in Botlikhsky District